Schinopsis balansae is a hardwood tree known as willow-leaf red quebracho which forms forests in the subtropical Humid Chaco ecoregion of north-eastern Argentina, and Paraguay. It is also found in the wild Pantanal vegetation in Brazil. Some of its vernacular names are quebracho colorado chaqueño and quebracho santafesino. Other species, like Schinopsis lorentzii, bear the general name quebracho and have similar properties and uses. S. balansae shares its habitat with a species of the same genus, S. heterophylla, and the two are often confused.

This tree can reach 24 metres in height and more than one metre in diameter. Its trunk is straight, with a brownish-gray bark. Its wood is extremely heavy (relative density = 1.2). Its main use is the extraction of quebracho extract, which is 63% pure tannin.

The tree was declared Argentina's "National Forest Tree" in  1956.

Chemistry
Leuco-fisetinidin, a flavan-3,4-diol (leucoanthocyanidin) and a monomer of the condensed tannins called profisetinidins, can be extracted from the heartwoods of S. balansae.

References

  

balansae
Trees of Argentina
Trees of Brazil
Drought-tolerant trees
Least concern plants
National symbols of Argentina